Louis Aston Marantz Simpson (March 27, 1923 – September 14, 2012) was an American poet born in Jamaica. He won the 1964 Pulitzer Prize for Poetry for his work At the End of the Open Road.

Life and career
Simpson was born in Jamaica, the son of Rosalind (née Marantz) and Aston Simpson, a lawyer. His father was of Scottish and African ancestry. His mother was born in Russia (Simpson did not find out that he was of Jewish descent until his teenage years). At the age of 17, he emigrated to the United States and began attending Columbia University, where he studied under Mark Van Doren. During World War II, from 1943 to 1945 he was a member of the elite 101st Airborne Division and would fight in France, the Netherlands, Belgium, and Germany. Simpson was a runner for the company captain, which involved transporting orders from company headquarters to officers on the front line. His company was involved in a very bloody battle with German forces on the west bank of what is now the Carentan France Marina - Simpson wrote his poem "Carentan O Carentan" about the experience of US troops being ambushed there. In the Netherlands, he was involved in Market Garden and Opheusden fighting. At Veghel his company suffered 21 killed in a brutal shelling while in the local church yard. At Bastogne bitterly cold temperatures had to be endured while the 101st Division was surrounded by enemy forces for days. After the end of the war he attended the University of Paris. Subsequently, he returned to the US and worked as an editor in New York. He later completed his B.A. at Columbia University's School of General Studies in 1948, and completed his M.A. and Ph.D. at Columbia University in 1950 and 1959, respectively.

His first book was The Arrivistes, published in 1949. It was hailed for its strong formal verse, but Simpson later moved away from the style of his early successes and embraced a spare brand of free verse.

He taught at universities including Columbia, the University of California-Berkeley, and the State University of New York at Stony Brook. He also briefly taught at The Stony Brook School prior to his retirement. Simpson's lifelong expatriate status has influenced his poetry, and he often uses the lives of ordinary Americans in order to critically investigate the myths the country tells itself. Although he occasionally revisits the West Indies of his childhood, he always keeps one foot in his adopted country. The outsider's perspective allows him to confront "the terror and beauty of life with a wry sense of humor and a mysterious sense of fate," wrote Edward Hirsch of The Washington Post. Elsewhere Hirsch described Simpson's Pulitzer Prize–winning collection, At the End of the Open Road, as "a sustained meditation on the American character," noting, "The moral genius of this book is that it traverses the open road of American mythology and brings us back to ourselves; it sees us not as we wish to be but as we are." Collected Poems (1988) and There You Are (1995) focus on the lives of everyday citizens, using simple diction and narratives to expose the bewildering reality of the American dream. Poet Mark Jarman hailed Simpson as "a poet of the American character and vernacular."

Simpson lived on the North Shore of Long Island, near Stony Brook, New York. He died on September 14, 2012.

Awards
 1962 Guggenheim Fellowship
 1964 Pulitzer Prize
 Rome Prize
 1998 Harold Morton Landon Translation Award
 2004 Finalist, Griffin Poetry Prize (International)

Selected works

Novels
 Riverside Drive. Publisher, Atheneum, 1962

Poetry
 
 
 
 
 
 
 
 
 
 
 
 
 
 
 
 
 

Translations

Non-fiction

References

External links

Poetry Foundation biographical essay and online poems
Griffin Poetry Prize biography
Griffin Poetry Prize reading, including video clip
Community remembers sacrifices in Harrison Daily, Harrison, Arkansas

1923 births
20th-century American poets
Columbia Graduate School of Arts and Sciences alumni
Columbia University School of General Studies alumni
2012 deaths
Pulitzer Prize for Poetry winners
Stony Brook University faculty
Emigrants from British Jamaica to the United States
French–English translators
United States Army personnel of World War II
Deaths from dementia in New York (state)
Deaths from Alzheimer's disease
20th-century translators
American male poets
Jewish American poets
21st-century American poets
20th-century American male writers
21st-century American male writers
United States Army soldiers
Jamaican people of Scottish descent
American people of Scottish descent
American people of Russian-Jewish descent
Jamaican people of Jewish descent
21st-century American Jews
Linguists from Jamaica